Finchville may refer to:

Finchville, Kentucky, an unincorporated community within Shelby County
Finchville, Nebraska, an unincorporated community in Custer County
a hamlet in Mount Hope, Orange County, New York